Michael Yingling (born July 10, 1972) is an American voice actor and the official soundalike for the Disney character Stitch. Yingling briefly filled in for Chris Sanders on four episodes of season 1 of Lilo & Stitch: The Series. Yingling did most of the studio recording for season 2, but was recorded over by Sanders during ADR.

Mr. Yingling participated in the production of "Stitch's Picture Phone", a now-closed interactive attraction at Disneyland's Innoventions whose use of groundbreaking voice-activated animation technology won a Thea Award from the Themed Entertainment Association in 2003.

Filmography

References

External links

American male voice actors
Living people
1972 births